Matnakash is a leavened traditional Armenian bread. The word matnakash means "finger draw" or "finger pull", referring to the way the bread is prepared. It is made of wheat flour with yeast or sourdough starter. It is shaped into oval or round loaves with longitudinal or criss-crossed scoring. The characteristic golden or golden-brown color of its crust is achieved by coating the surface of the loaves with sweetened tea essence before baking.

Matnakash is also popular in places with large Armenian populations as a result of the Armenian diaspora.

History 
Matnakash was honored in Soviet times. In the 1930s, food specialists in Soviet Armenia wanted to mark the new communist country with a more modern-looking bread. The matnakash became a mass-produced urban bread. Even the bakers' patterns on the bread were re-interpreted to fit the Soviet agenda. It resembled a plowed field with rows and furrows. The bread's rim was interpreted as an agricultural field and its imprinted lines as tilled rows.

See also 

 Barbari bread from Iran
 Lavash, a thin unleavened flatbread from Armenia
 Naan from India and Pakistan
 Pita
 Ramadan pita, a similar bread from Turkey
 Tonis puri from Georgia
 Manakish from the Levant
 Pizza from Italy

References 

Armenian breads